Filth is a 2013 black comedy crime film written and directed by Jon S. Baird, based on Irvine Welsh's 1998 novel Filth. The film was released on 27 September 2013 in Scotland, 4 October 2013 elsewhere in the United Kingdom and in Ireland, and on 30 May 2014 in the United States. It stars James McAvoy, Jamie Bell, and Jim Broadbent.

Plot
Detective Sergeant Bruce Robertson, a scheming, manipulative, misanthropic bully, spends his free time indulging in drugs, alcohol, abusive sexual relationships, and "the games" — his euphemism for vindictive plots he hatches to cause trouble for people he dislikes, including many of his colleagues in the Edinburgh police force.

Bruce also delights in bullying and taking advantage of his mild-mannered friend Clifford Blades, a member of Bruce's masonic lodge, whose wife, Bunty, is the target of his repeated obscene phone calls. He only shows genuine warmth to Mary and her young son, the widowed wife and child of a man whom he tries and fails to resuscitate after he suffers a heart attack in the street.

As the story begins, Bruce's main goal is to gain a promotion to become Detective Inspector, the path to which appears to open when he is assigned to oversee the investigation into the murder of a Japanese exchange student. However, Bruce slowly loses his grip on reality as he works the case and has more and more vivid hallucinations.

It is ultimately revealed through dream-like exchanges with Dr. Rossi, Bruce's psychiatrist, that he is on medication for bipolar disorder and has repressed immense feelings of guilt over a childhood accident that led to the death of his younger brother. We learn his wife Carole has left him and is denying him access to his daughter Stacey.

These domestic issues sparked his desperate bid for promotion, played a part in his unusual displays of kindness toward Mary and her son, and have also led him to start cross-dressing as his wife when off duty in order to "keep her close" to him.

While wandering the streets on such an occasion, Bruce is kidnapped by a street gang led by the thuggish Gorman — who are responsible for the murder — and badly beaten. However, he manages to kill Gorman by throwing him through a window and is found by his colleagues. Bruce not only misses out on the promotion as a result of the events, but is in fact demoted to Constable and is reassigned to uniform, while rookie Ray Lennox is promoted to Detective Inspector.

Afterwards, Blades receives a tape of Bruce apologising. Bruce then prepares to commit suicide by hanging, but is interrupted at the last moment by Mary and her son knocking at his front door. He then breaks the fourth wall and addresses the audience repeating his catchphrase — "same rules apply" — and laughs as the chair slips from under him.

Cast

Production
Welsh's novel was published in 1998, but over the following years the project was passed between producers and acquired a reputation of being "un-filmable".

Music

Track listing
Other notable pieces include

 Symphony No. 5 in C Minor, Op. 67: I. Allegro con brio
 "Libiamo Ne'lieti Calici (Brindisi)
 Sandstorm
 Mr. Vain
 Theme from Elvira Madigan
 Les noces de Figaro, K. 492: Ouverture
 La donna è mobile

Reception

Box office
The film earned £250,000 in the box office revenue during its opening weekend in Scotland, reaching number one in the charts. It grossed £842,167 ($1.4m) in the following weekend, when it went on general release throughout the United Kingdom. The film ultimately ended up grossing $9.1 million worldwide.

Critical response 

On Rotten Tomatoes, the film has an approval rating of 66% based on 97 reviews and an average rating of 6.20/10. The website's critical consensus reads, "Warped, grimy and enthusiastically unpleasant, Filth lives up to its title splendidly." The film also has a score of 56 out of 100 on Metacritic based on 24 reviews, indicating "mixed or average reviews".

References

External links
 
 
 
 

2013 black comedy films
2010s Christmas comedy-drama films
2010s crime comedy-drama films
2013 independent films
2013 films
British black comedy films
British Christmas comedy-drama films
British crime comedy-drama films
British independent films
Cross-dressing in film
English-language Scottish films
English-language German films
English-language Belgian films
English-language Swedish films
Films about bipolar disorder
Films about drugs
Films based on British novels
Films directed by Jon S. Baird
Films produced by Trudie Styler
Films scored by Clint Mansell
Films set in Edinburgh
Films shot in Edinburgh
Icon Productions films
Lionsgate films
Scottish comedy films
2010s English-language films
2010s British films